Muribacinus gadiyuli lived during the middle Miocene in Riversleigh. The species name comes from Wanyi aboriginal word for "little", in reference to its considerably small size compared to the modern thylacine and was similar in size to a fox-terrier dog, and "father" for the ancestral characteristics of the fossilised teeth.

M. gadiyuli was a quadrupedal marsupial predator, that in appearance looked similar to a dog with a long snout. Its molar teeth were specialized for carnivory; the cups and crest were reduced or elongated to give the molars a cutting blade.

The holotype and only specimens are a well preserved right maxilla, right dentary, and the holotype, a section of the jugal bone.

Taxonomy
The description by Stephen Wroe was published in 1995, the author deriving the specific epithet from a Wanyi word gadiyuli, meaning "little"; the Wanyi people are associated with the type location at Riversleigh. The new species was assigned to a new genus of Thylacinidae, the generic name Muribacinus was also derived from the Wanyi language, the term muriba for father combined with the Ancient Greek term for dog, kynos, for the assumed classification as an early thylacinid species.

References

External links
Natural Worlds 

Prehistoric thylacines
Prehistoric mammals of Australia
Miocene marsupials
Riversleigh fauna
Prehistoric marsupial genera